Michele Matheson (born August 14, 1971) is an American actress and novelist.

Early life 
Matheson is the daughter of actors Don Matheson and Deanna Lund. Her parents met while performing together in the Irwin Allen science fiction series Land of the Giants (1968–1970) and married soon after the show was cancelled. Michele has two half-siblings (an older brother, Randy, and sister, Kim). She attended Marymount High School in Los Angeles.

Career 
Matheson began her career on the television shows Life Goes On and Mr. Belvedere before starring in the direct-to-video movie Howling VI: The Freaks (1991) and appearing in Threesome (1994). In 2002 she co-starred in the Academy Award nominated short film Johnny Flynton. She is also a singer/keyboardist and has recorded with a band, The Black Tales. In 2006, Tin House Books published Saving Angelfish, a story loosely based on her life.

Filmography

Film

Television

References

External links

1971 births
Living people
21st-century American novelists
Place of birth missing (living people)
American actresses
American women novelists
21st-century American women writers